How I Go may refer to:

Albums 
 How I Go (Kenny Wayne Shepherd album), 2011

Songs 
 "How I Go", a song by Yellowcard from Lights and Sounds